The Hampshire and Isle of Wight Police and Crime Commissioner, previously Hampshire Police and Crime Commissioner, is the police and crime commissioner, an elected official tasked with setting out the way crime is tackled by Hampshire and Isle of Wight Constabulary in the English counties of Hampshire and the Isle of Wight. The post was created in November 2012, following an election held on 15 November 2012, and replaced the Hampshire Police Authority. The incumbent is Donna Jones, who represents the Conservative Party.

In November 2022, the force and PCC were renamed Hampshire and Isle of Wight.

List of Hampshire police and crime commissioners

Elections

2021 election

Donna Jones won every counting area in Hampshire, with the closest being the traditionally-Labour City of Southampton, where she won by 877 votes.

References

External links

Police and crime commissioners in England